The following is the complete filmography of American actor Harry Dean Stanton (July 14, 1926 – September 15, 2017).

Film

Television

Video Games

Music Videos

References

External links

 
 
 
 

Male actor filmographies
American filmographies